Aleong is a surname. Notable people with the surname include:

Aki Aleong (born 1934), Trinidad and Tobago-born American actor and singer
Andy Aleong (born 1943), Trinidad and Tobago cricketer and footballer
Eddie Aleong (born 1937), Trinidad and Tobago cricketer